The Toronean Gulf or Toroneos Gulf and Toronaic Gulf, also known as the Kassandra Gulf, is a gulf of the Thracian Sea, part of the northern Aegean Sea, in Chalkidiki, Greece. It lies between the Kassandra peninsula in the west, and Sithonia in the east.

History
According to Herodotus, the gulf was historically known for its fish. The harbour of Torone, the only city on the gulf, was known as the "deaf" harbour due to the gulf's quietness and calmness.

The ancient city of Olynthus was said to be at the head of the Toronean Gulf.

References 

Gulfs of Greece

Thracian Sea
Landforms of Chalkidiki